Geoffrey Shawn Fletcher (born October 4, 1970) is an American screenwriter and film director. Fletcher is best known for being the screenwriter of Precious, for which he received the Academy Award for Best Adapted Screenplay, becoming the first African American to receive an Academy Award for writing.   In September 2010, Fletcher began shooting Violet & Daisy in New York City based on his original script as his directorial debut. It was released in a limited theatrical run in June 2013.

Early life
Fletcher was born in New London, Connecticut, one of three children of Alphonse Fletcher, Sr. and Bettye R. Fletcher. Alphonse Fletcher, Jr.  and Todd Fletcher are his brothers. Fletcher attended Waterford High School in Waterford, Connecticut prior to completing his secondary education at Choate Rosemary Hall. Fletcher graduated from Harvard College where he concentrated in psychology and from NYU's Tisch School  where he earned a Master of Fine Arts. His student film Magic Markers, which he wrote and directed, was shown at festivals and caught the attention of director John Singleton.

Career

Fletcher worked in a variety of temporary staff positions for years as he wrote and directed his own films. Eventually he was appointed an adjunct professor at Tisch and also at Columbia. In 2006, producer Lee Daniels viewed Magic Markers and asked Fletcher to adapt the book Push by Sapphire which became the film Precious. Daniels, well known to be "passionately dedicated" to artists "serious about their craft," considered several writers before choosing Fletcher according to a Variety article that included Fletcher among the "Ten Screenwriters to Watch." Fletcher is represented by his agents Bill Weinstein, Nicky Mohebbi, and Manal Hamad of Verve and by the law firm of Gang, Tyre, Ramer, and Brown.

On February 16, 2010 director Doug Liman and Fletcher announced that they would be collaborating on a film re-creation of the 1971 Attica state prison rebellion. Fletcher said in a statement "Working with a remarkable director in Doug Liman whose family history binds him personally to this project, I hope to create opportunities for re-examination of this dramatic crossroad in our nation's history while contributing to the current dialogue on the value of protecting everyone's rights."

Filmography
 Precious (2009) - writer
 Violet & Daisy (2011) - director, writer
 Trial by Fire (2018) - writer

Recognition

Screenwriting awards for Precious
Best Adapted Screenplay at 82nd Academy Awards
Best First Screenplay at 25th Independent Spirit Awards
Winner Outstanding Writing in a Motion Picture at 41st NAACP Image Awards
Best Screenplay – Adapted Geoffrey Fletcher at 14th Satellite Awards
Best Screenplay Geoffrey Fletcher at 7th AAFCA Awards
Best Screenplay, Original or Adapted Geoffrey Fletcher at 10th Black Reel Awards

Screenwriting nominations for Precious
Best Screenplay – Adapted at 8th Washington D.C. Area Film Critics Association
Best Screenplay, Adapted at 4th Alliance of Women Film Journalists Award
Best Screenplay at 3rd Houston Film Critics Society Awards
Best Adapted Screenplay at 14th Florida Film Critics Circle Awards
Scripter Award at Sapphire 23rd USC Scripter Awards
Adapted Screenplay at 62nd Writers Guild of America Awards
Adapted Screenplay at 63rd British Academy Film Awards

Awards and Festivals for Magic Markers
Directors Guild of America Student Film Award, 1996.
Shown at Hamptons International Film Festival October 18–22, 1995.
Shown at Sundance Film Festival (Shorts Program) in Park City, Utah January 18–28, 1996.

See also
List of Academy Award records

References

External links

 

1970 births
Living people
American male screenwriters
Best Adapted Screenplay Academy Award winners
Choate Rosemary Hall alumni
Harvard College alumni
Tisch School of the Arts alumni
Independent Spirit Award winners
Writers from New London, Connecticut
New York University staff
Columbia University staff
African-American screenwriters